Erinnyis pallida, the pallid sphinx, is a moth of the family Sphingidae. The species was first described by Augustus Radcliffe Grote in 1865. It is known from Cuba.

The wingspan is 56–65 mm. Adults are probably on wing year round and possibly feed on the nectar of various flowers, including Saponaria officinalis and Asystasia gangetica.

References

Erinnyis
Moths described in 1865
Endemic fauna of Cuba